
Gmina Śliwice is a rural gmina (administrative district) in Tuchola County, Kuyavian-Pomeranian Voivodeship, in north-central Poland.

The gmina contains part of the protected area called Tuchola Landscape Park.

Villages
Gmina Śliwice contains the villages and settlements of Brzeźno Małe, Brzozowe Błota, Byłyczek, Główka, Krąg, Laski, Łąski Piec, Linówek, Lińsk, Lipowa, Lisiny, Lubocień, Okoniny, Okoniny Nadjeziorne, Rosochatka, Śliwice, Śliwiczki and Zwierzyniec.

Neighbouring gminas
Gmina Śliwice is bordered by the gminas of Cekcyn, Czersk, Osie, Osieczna, Osiek and Tuchola.

References
 Polish official population figures 2006

Sliwice
Tuchola County